Endeavor is a community in Hickory Township, Forest County, Pennsylvania, along Allegheny National Forest, on Pennsylvania Route 666.

History
The community was named after the Christian Endeavor Society, who were the original inhabitants of the town. Before it was called Endeavor, it was called Stowtown.

References

Unincorporated communities in Pennsylvania
Unincorporated communities in Forest County, Pennsylvania